Danièle Darlan (born 1952) is a Central African lawyer, professor and jurist who served as President of the nation's Constitutional Court from 2017 to 2022. Her appointment was abruptly revoked by President Faustin-Archange Touadéra in an October 2022 presidential decree. Jean-Pierre Waboe temporarily assumed her role on 28 October 2022.

Early life and education
Darlan's father Georges Darlan was the president of the Representative Council of Ubangi-Shari from 1949 to 1952. She obtained a doctorate in law in France.

Career
Darlan was professor of public at the University of Bangui for thirty years, in a country where there are very few women professors, and low numbers of girls completing higher education. She has said, "I feel like it is a personal failure. Maybe I inspired someone outside the university; maybe I was more an example for boys than girls."

Darlan served as vice-president of the Constitutional Court from 2013, before being elected president in 2017. She is the first woman in the role. In June 2020, she refused to give approval to revisions of the Constitution proposed by the National Assembly and supported by President Faustin-Archange Touadéra, which would have allowed him to stay in power and delay the electoral process.

It was Darlan's role to declare the outcome of the controversial 2020–2021 election, declaring Touadera's victory and rejecting a suit filed by 13 of the 16 other candidates arguing there had been "massive fraud". She said the court had "not received any pressure, either from the president, or from the special representative of the UN secretary general, or from any embassy."

Selected publications

References

Living people
1952 births
Academic staff of the University of Bangui
Central African Republic judges
Central African Republic lawyers
21st-century judges
21st-century women judges
Constitutional court women judges
Constitutional court judges
Women chief justices